Amjet Executive SA is a European air charter company operating business jets, headquartered in the Greek city of Athens with a brokerage department based in Geneva, Switzerland. It flies Dassault Falcons, an Airbus A319CJ and a corporate-configured McDonnell Douglas MD-83. The company holds a Greek air operator's certificate (AOC).

History
Amjet Executive SA was founded at the end of 2009 by airline pilot Abakar Manany. The company commenced operations in February 2010 when it was granted an AOC to operate a Gulfstream G200. In May 2011 the company opened its air charter brokerage department in Geneva, Switzerland.

Fleet

References

External links

Airlines of Greece
Airlines established in 2009
Aviation in Europe
Greek companies established in 2009